Mayun may refer to :
 Mayian, the preparation ceremony one day before a Punjabi wedding
 Mayun Island, a volcanic island in the Strait of Mandeb at the south entrance into the Red Sea
 Jack Ma (Chinese: 马云, pinyin: Mǎ Yún), co-founder and former executive chairman of Alibaba Group
 Gitee (Chinese: 码云, pinyin: Mǎyún), a source code hosting platform.